Lars Becker (born 12 January 1954, Hanover) is a German film director, screenwriter, and crime writer.

Selected filmography
 Schattenboxer (1992)
  (1995)
 Das Gelbe vom Ei (1999, TV film)
  (2000)
 Rette deine Haut (2001, TV film)
  (since 2003, TV series, 16 episodes)
  (2008, TV film)
  (2010, TV film)
 Unter Feinden (2013–2021, TV series, 4 episodes)
 Der gute Bulle (since 2017, TV series, 3 episodes)

External links
 
 
 
 

German crime writers
Mass media people from Lower Saxony
Film people from Hanover
1954 births
Living people